The 1996 Big Ten Conference baseball tournament was held at Beaver Field on the campus of Pennsylvania State University in State College, Pennsylvania from May 15 through 19. The top four teams from the regular season participated in the double-elimination tournament, the sixteenth annual tournament sponsored by the Big Ten Conference to determine the league champion.  won their first tournament championship and earned the Big Ten Conference's automatic bid to the 1996 NCAA Division I baseball tournament.

Format and seeding 
The 1996 tournament was a 4-team double-elimination tournament, with seeds determined by conference regular season winning percentage only.

Tournament

All-Tournament Team 
The following players were named to the All-Tournament Team.

Most Outstanding Player 
Dan Ferrell was named Most Outstanding Player. Ferrell was a pitcher for Indiana.

References 

Tournament
Big Ten baseball tournament
Big Ten Baseball Tournament
Big Ten baseball tournament